The following is a list of notable vocal Christian artists.

The Encyclopedia of Contemporary Christian Music (2002) defines CCM as "music that appeals to self-identified fans of contemporary Christian music on account of a perceived connection to what they regard as Christianity". Based on this definition, this list includes artists that work in the Christian music industry as well as artists in the general market.

Note: Because classifying music by genre can be arbitrary, these groupings are generalized and many artists appear on multiple lists.

 Acappella
 AVB (a.k.a. Acappella Vocal Band)
 David M. Bailey
 First Call
 4Him
 Robert Galea
 The Imperials
 Ladysmith Black Mambazo
 NewSong
 Sandi Patty
 Take 6

Notes

See also
 Contemporary Christian music
 List of Christian bands and artists by genre

Vocal
Lists of musicians by genre
Lists of singers